The 2nd United States Air Force Trophy was a Formula Two motor race held on 25 July 1953 at Snetterton Circuit, Norfolk. The race was run over 15 laps, and was won by British driver Tony Rolt in a Connaught Type A-Lea Francis. Bob Gerard in a Cooper T23-Bristol was second and set fastest lap. Leslie Marr in a Connaught Type A-Lea Francis was third. Earlier in the day of the meeting Ferrari driver Bobbie Baird was killed in a sports-car race.

Results

References 

1953 Formula Two races
1953 in British motorsport